Henry Tate Boney (October 28, 1903 – June 12, 2002) was an American professional baseball player who was a relief pitcher in Major League Baseball during part of the 1927 season.  Boney appeared in three games, all in relief, for the New York Giants.

Boney was born in Wallace, North Carolina.  He attended the University of Florida in Gainesville, where he played for coach Lance Richbourg and coach Brady Cowell's Florida Gators baseball teams in 1926 and 1927.

Boney made his major league debut as 23-year-old rookie against the Philadelphia Phillies at Baker Bowl on June 28, 1927.  He made his third and final relief appearance on July 13.  Boney finished all three games in which he appeared, and pitched a total of four innings, giving up just one earned run.  Boney's record was 0–0 with a 2.25 earned run average.

See also 

 Florida Gators
 List of Florida Gators baseball players

External links 

 Retrosheet

1903 births
2002 deaths
Baseball players from North Carolina
Florida Gators baseball players
Major League Baseball pitchers
New York Giants (NL) players
People from Wallace, North Carolina